The wooden jaw harp or shangqobyz (pronounced ) is a type of jaw harp made out of wood, common in the folk music of Turkic peoples in Central Asia.  The principals used to produce notes are similar to those for a metal jaw harp, but wooden jaw harps are often much larger in size, resembling a simple bow.

The instrument is used in Toi folk music in Central Asia.

Kazakhstani musical instruments
Kyrgyz musical instruments
Tuvan musical instruments